Suite 420 is Devin the Dude's sixth studio album. It was released on April 20, 2010.

Track listing

Sample credits
"I Can't Handle It" - Contains a sample of "Let Me Down Easy" by The Isley Brothers
"We Get High" - Contains a sample of "Wednesday Lover" by The Gap Band

References

2010 albums
Devin the Dude albums
E1 Music albums
Albums produced by Mike Dean (record producer)
Cannabis music